The Heck With Hollywood! is a 1991 American documentary film about independent film, directed by Doug Block.

Cast
 Gerry Cook - Himself
 Jennifer Fox - Herself
 Peter M. Hargrove - Distributor shaking hands at elevator
 Ted Lichtenfeld - Himself

References

External links

1991 films
1991 documentary films
American documentary films
Films directed by Doug Block
American independent films
Documentary films about the cinema of the United States
1991 independent films
1990s English-language films
1990s American films